Semantics (from  sēmantikós, "significant") is the study of reference, meaning, or truth. The term can be used to refer to subfields of several distinct disciplines, including philosophy, linguistics and computer science.

History

In English, the study of meaning in language has been known by many names that involve the Ancient Greek word  (sema, "sign, mark, token").

In 1690, a Greek rendering of the term semiotics, the interpretation of signs and symbols, finds an early allusion in John Locke's An Essay Concerning Human Understanding:
The third Branch may be called  [simeiotikí, "semiotics"], or the Doctrine of Signs, the most usual whereof being words, it is aptly enough termed also , Logick.

In 1831, the term  is suggested for the third branch of division of knowledge akin to Locke; the "signs of our knowledge".

In 1857, the term semasiology (borrowed from German Semasiologie) is attested in Josiah W. Gibbs' Philological studies with English illustrations:
The development of intellectual and moral ideas from physical, constitutes an important part of semasiology, or that branch of grammar which treats of the development of the meaning of words. It is built on the analogy and correlation of the physical and intellectual worlds.

In 1893, the term semantics is used to translate French sémantique as used by Michel Bréal. Some years later, in Essai de Sémantique, Bréal writes:
What I have tried to do is to draw some broad lines, to mark some divisions and as a provisional plan on a field not yet exploited, and which requires the combined work of several generations of linguists. I therefore ask the reader to consider this book as a simple Introduction to the science I have proposed to call Semantics. [In footnote:]  , the science of  [i.e., what it means], from the verb  "to signify", as opposed to Phonetics, the science of sounds [i.e., what it sounds like].

In 1922, the concept of semantics is attested in mathematical logic amidst a group of scholars in Poland including Leon Chwistek, Leśniewski, Łukasiewicz, Kotarbinski, Adjukiewicz, and Tarski. According to Allen Walker Read, they had been influenced by French culture; moreover, later, their work influenced Alfred Korzybski's usage of the term.

In the 1960s, semantics for programming languages is attested in publications by Robert W. Floyd and Tony Hoare, later termed axiomatic semantics; its chief application is formal verification of computer programs. Some years later, the terms operational semantics and denotational semantics emerged. Floyd, in the lead to his 1967 paper Assigning meanings to programs, writes:
A semantic definition of a programming language, in our approach, is founded on a syntactic definition. It must specify which of the phrases in a syntactically correct program represent commands, and what conditions must be imposed on an interpretation in the neighborhood of each command.

Linguistics
In linguistics, semantics is the subfield that studies meaning. Semantics can address meaning at the levels of words, phrases, sentences, or larger units of discourse. Two of the fundamental issues in the field of semantics are that of compositional semantics (which pertains on how smaller parts, like words, combine and interact to form the meaning of larger expressions, such as sentences) and lexical semantics (the nature of the meaning of words). Other prominent issues are those of context and its role on interpretation, opaque contexts, ambiguity, vagueness, entailment, and presuppositions.

Several disciplines and approaches have contributed to the often-contentious field of semantics. One of the crucial questions which unites different approaches to linguistic semantics is that of the relationship between form and meaning. Some major contributions to the study of semantics have derived from studies in the 1980–1990s in related subjects of the syntax–semantics interface and pragmatics.

The semantic level of language interacts with other modules or levels (like syntax) in which language is traditionally divided. In linguistics, it is typical to talk in terms of "interfaces" regarding such interactions between modules or levels. For semantics, the most crucial interfaces are considered those with syntax (the syntax–semantics interface), pragmatics, and phonology (regarding prosody and intonation).

Disciplines and paradigms in linguistic semantics

Formal semantics

Formal semantics seeks to identify domain-specific mental operations which speakers perform when they compute a sentence's meaning on the basis of its syntactic structure. Theories of formal semantics are typically floated on top of theories of syntax, such as generative syntax or combinatory categorial grammar, and provided a model theory based on mathematical tools, such as typed lambda calculi. The field's central ideas are rooted in early twentieth century philosophical logic, as well as later ideas about linguistic syntax. It emerged as its own subfield in the 1970s after the pioneering work of Richard Montague and Barbara Partee and continues to be an active area of research.

Conceptual semantics

This theory is an effort to explain properties of argument structure. The assumption behind this theory is that syntactic properties of phrases reflect the meanings of the words that head them. With this theory, linguists can better deal with the fact that subtle differences in word meaning correlate with other differences in the syntactic structure that the word appears in. The way this is gone about is by looking at the internal structure of words. These small parts that make up the internal structure of words are termed semantic primitives.

Cognitive semantics

Cognitive semantics approaches meaning from the perspective of cognitive linguistics. In this framework, language is explained via general human cognitive abilities rather than a domain-specific language module. The techniques native to cognitive semantics are typically used in lexical studies such as those put forth by Leonard Talmy, George Lakoff, Dirk Geeraerts, and Bruce Wayne Hawkins. Some cognitive semantic frameworks, such as that developed by Talmy, take into account syntactic structures as well.

Lexical semantics

A linguistic theory that investigates word meaning. This theory understands that the meaning of a word is fully reflected by its context. Here, the meaning of a word is constituted by its contextual relations. Therefore, a distinction between degrees of participation as well as modes of participation are made. In order to accomplish this distinction, any part of a sentence that bears a meaning and combines with the meanings of other constituents is labeled as a semantic constituent. Semantic constituents that cannot be broken down into more elementary constituents are labeled minimal semantic constituents.

Cross-cultural semantics

Various fields or disciplines have long been contributing to cross-cultural semantics. Are words like love, truth, and hate universals? Is even the word sense – so central to semantics – a universal, or a concept entrenched in a long-standing but culture-specific tradition? These are the kind of crucial questions that are discussed in cross-cultural semantics. Translation theory, ethnolinguistics, linguistic anthropology and cultural linguistics specialize in the field of comparing, contrasting, and translating words, terms and meanings from one language to another (see J. G. Herder, Wilhelm von Humboldt, Franz Boas, Edward Sapir, and B. L. Whorf). Philosophy, sociology, and anthropology have long established traditions in contrasting the different nuances of the terms and concepts we use. Online encyclopaedias such as the Stanford Encyclopedia of Philosophyand Wikipedia itself have greatly facilitated the possibilities of comparing the background and usages of key cultural terms. In recent years, the question of whether key terms are translatable or untranslatable has increasingly come to the fore of global discussions, especially since the publication of Barbara Cassin's Dictionary of Untranslatables: A Philosophical Lexicon, in 2014.

Computational semantics

Computational semantics is focused on the processing of linguistic meaning. In order to do this, concrete algorithms and architectures are described. Within this framework the algorithms and architectures are also analyzed in terms of decidability, time/space complexity, data structures that they require and communication protocols.

Philosophy

Many of the formal approaches to semantics in mathematical logic and computer science originated in early twentieth century philosophy of language and philosophical logic. Initially, the most influential semantic theory stemmed from Gottlob Frege and Bertrand Russell. Frege and Russell are seen as the originators of a tradition in analytic philosophy to explain meaning compositionally via syntax and mathematical functionality. Ludwig Wittgenstein, a former student of Russell, is also seen as one of the seminal figures in the analytic tradition. All three of these early philosophers of language were concerned with how sentences expressed information in the form of propositions. They also dealt with the truth values or truth conditions a given sentence has in virtue of the proposition it expresses.

In present day philosophy, the term "semantics" is often used to refer to linguistic formal semantics, which bridges both linguistics and philosophy. There is also an active tradition of metasemantics, which studies the foundations of natural language semantics.

Computer science

In computer science, the term semantics refers to the meaning of language constructs, as opposed to their form (syntax). According to Euzenat, semantics "provides the rules for interpreting the syntax which do not provide the meaning directly but constrains the possible interpretations of what is declared".

Programming languages
The semantics of programming languages and other languages is an important issue and area of study in computer science. Like the syntax of a language, its semantics can be defined exactly.

For instance, the following statements use different syntaxes, but lead the computer to perform the same operations—add the value of a variable 'y' to the value of a variable 'x' and store the result in x:

Various ways have been developed to describe the semantics of programming languages formally, building on mathematical logic:
 Operational semantics: The meaning of a construct is specified by the computation it induces when it is executed on a machine. In particular, it is of interest how the effect of a computation is produced.
 Denotational semantics: Meanings are modelled by mathematical objects that represent the effect of executing the constructs. Thus, only the effect is of interest, not how it is obtained.
 Axiomatic semantics: Specific properties of the effect of executing the constructs are expressed as assertions. Thus there may be aspects of the executions that are ignored.

Semantic models

The Semantic Web refers to the extension of the World Wide Web via embedding added semantic metadata, using semantic data modeling techniques such as Resource Description Framework (RDF) and Web Ontology Language (OWL). On the Semantic Web, terms such as semantic network and semantic data model are used to describe particular types of data model characterized by the use of directed graphs in which the vertices denote concepts or entities in the world and their properties, and the arcs denote relationships between them. These can formally be described as description logic concepts and roles, which correspond to OWL classes and properties.

Psychology

Semantic memory
In psychology, semantic memory is memory for meaning – in other words, the aspect of memory that preserves only the gist, the general significance, of remembered experience – while episodic memory is memory for the ephemeral details – the individual features, or the unique particulars of experience. The term "episodic memory" was introduced by Tulving and Schacter in the context of "declarative memory", which involved simple association of factual or objective information concerning its object. Word meaning is measured by the company they keep, i.e. the relationships among words themselves in a semantic network. The memories may be transferred intergenerationally or isolated in one generation due to a cultural disruption. Different generations may have different experiences at similar points in their own time-lines. This may then create a vertically heterogeneous semantic net for certain words in an otherwise homogeneous culture. In a network created by people analyzing their understanding of the word (such as Wordnet) the links and decomposition structures of the network are few in number and kind, and include part of, kind of, and similar links. In automated ontologies the links are computed vectors without explicit meaning. Various automated technologies are being developed to compute the meaning of words: latent semantic indexing and support vector machines, as well as natural language processing, artificial neural networks and predicate calculus techniques.

Ideasthesia
Ideasthesia is a psychological phenomenon in which activation of concepts evokes sensory experiences. For example, in synesthesia, activation of a concept of a letter (e.g., that of the letter A) evokes sensory-like experiences (e.g., of red color).

Psychosemantics
In the 1960s, psychosemantic studies became popular after Charles E. Osgood's massive cross-cultural studies using his semantic differential (SD) method that used thousands of nouns and adjective bipolar scales. A specific form of the SD, Projective Semantics method uses only most common and neutral nouns that correspond to the 7 groups (factors) of adjective-scales most consistently found in cross-cultural studies (Evaluation, Potency, Activity as found by Osgood, and Reality, Organization, Complexity, Limitation as found in other studies). In this method, seven groups of bipolar adjective scales corresponded to seven types of nouns so the method was thought to have the object-scale symmetry (OSS) between the scales and nouns for evaluation using these scales. For example, the nouns corresponding to the listed 7 factors would be: Beauty, Power, Motion, Life, Work, Chaos, Law. Beauty was expected to be assessed unequivocally as "very good" on adjectives of Evaluation-related scales, Life as "very real" on Reality-related scales, etc. However, deviations in this symmetric and very basic matrix might show underlying biases of two types: scales-related bias and objects-related bias. This OSS design meant to increase the sensitivity of the SD method to any semantic biases in responses of people within the same culture and educational background.

Prototype theory
Another set of concepts related to fuzziness in semantics is based on prototypes. The work of Eleanor Rosch in the 1970s led to a view that natural categories are not characterizable in terms of necessary and sufficient conditions, but are graded (fuzzy at their boundaries) and inconsistent as to the status of their constituent members. One may compare it with Jung's archetype, though the concept of archetype sticks to static concept. Some post-structuralists are against the fixed or static meaning of the words. Derrida, following Nietzsche, talked about slippages in fixed meanings.

Systems of categories are not objectively out there in the world but are rooted in people's experience. These categories evolve as learned concepts of the world – meaning is not an objective truth, but a subjective construct, learned from experience, and language arises out of the "grounding of our conceptual systems in shared embodiment and bodily experience".
A corollary of this is that the conceptual categories (i.e. the lexicon) will not be identical for different cultures, or indeed, for every individual in the same culture. This leads to another debate (see the Sapir–Whorf hypothesis or Eskimo words for snow).

See also

Notes

References

External links 

 Semanticsarchive.net
 Teaching page for GCE Advanced Level semantics
 "Semantics: an interview with Jerry Fodor" 

 

Concepts in logic
Grammar
+
Meaning (philosophy of language)
Social philosophy